thumb

 Victor Cesar Bota  (born November 7, 1972), a Brazilian writer, photographer, director, producer of Italian descent who began his artistic life as a painter.

Early life 
Bota began his artistic life as a painter when he was exposed to art at an early age by his grandmother Zaira O’Farill Cesar, who was a painter and his mother Cidalia Cesar, who is an architect, making it a natural progression for him to work in arts.

In 1984, while living in Rio de Janeiro, Bota befriended Renzo Gracie, who later became the subject of one of his projects.

In 1991, Bota started studying Fine Arts and he finished high school at the Miami Beach Senior High School. In the 1990s, Bota lived between New York, Miami, Los Angeles, New Orleans, and Seattle. In 1993, while in Seattle, Bota became roommates with Demri Lara Parrott, Layne Staley's girlfriend, whom he met at the Off Ramp Cafe. Later that year, Staley introduced Bota to Chris Cornell, Tom Niemeyer of Gruntruck and Kurt Cobain, with whom, at the heart of the Grunge movement, at age of 21, Bota started to frequent the Off Ramp Cafe, Lake Union Pub and The Crocodile Cafe and at that time, Bota started dedicating himself fully to the visual arts.

In 1999, upon his move to New York City, Bota rapidly assimilated into the city's cosmopolitan and vibrant culture and began experimenting with fashion photography and film-making. In 2000, Bota studied film at NYU Tisch School of the Arts.

On Saint Marks Place, Bota owned and operated the renowned Medusa Tattoo, one the few original East Village, Manhattan tattoo shops that survived after tattooing was legalized in New York City in 1997. Medusa Tattoo catered to several celebrities including Britney Spears, Foxy Brown, Julian Casablancas and served as the launchpad for many of New York City's well-known tattoo artists such as John Reardon, Eli Quinters, Chris Torres, Steve Boltz, and others. In 2004, Bota and his partner, John Paras, moved Medusa Tattoo to 120 E 7th Street. In 2012, Bota closed Medusa Tattoo and started to fully dedicate himself to photography and film.

Career 
While photographing fashion in New York City, Bota directed the short film “Freeman”. Co-produced by Fernando Meirelles' O2 Filmes, "Freeman" was a selection of several film festivals including the Brussels Film Festival, Palm Springs International Film Festival, Montreal World Film Festival, Festival de Brasília, Belo Horizonte Film Festival, São Paulo International Film Festival and Festival do Rio.

Bota's music video "Call My Name" was nominated in the MTV Video Music Brazil Awards and this led to more work directing with Sony | BMG. Such as Wanessa Camargo – "Amor Amor", Medulla – "Munição na Mamadeira" and Forro in the Dark – "Nonsensical". Bota created and wrote the mini-series "Incessant" about the legendary Gracie family and the remarkable creation and expansion of Ultimate Fighting Championship around the world, and directed The Gracies and the Birth of Vale Tudo a documentary based on the research for "Incessant", which the music was by Mauro Refosco, Forro in the Dark and Ilhan Ersahin and others from Nublu Records. The Gracies and the Birth of Vale Tudo was screened at the São Paulo International Film Festival and Festival do Rio.

Filmography

Music video

References

Brazilian painters
Brazilian photographers
1972 births
Living people
Brazilian film directors